Only One is a song by the Goo Goo Dolls. A power pop track, It was the first single released from their 1995 breakthrough album A Boy Named Goo. The single was also released in a limited edition pink vinyl with "Slave Girl" and "Disconnected" on the B-side.

In Australia and Germany, the song was released as a CD single, with non-album track "Hit or Miss" and the fifth track from A Boy Named Goo, "Impersonality", appearing instead.

Track listing

U.S. Single
"Only One" - 3:18
"Slave Girl" - 2:17
"Disconnected" - 3:00

German Single
WBR 43543
"Only One" (radio edit) - 3:09
"Impersonality" - 2:43
"Hit Or Miss" - 2:44

Charts

References

1995 singles
Goo Goo Dolls songs
Warner Records singles
American power pop songs